Epichloë mollis is a haploid sexual species in the fungal genus Epichloë. 

A systemic and seed-transmissible grass symbiont first described in 1982,  Epichloë mollis is a sister lineage to Epichloë amarillans, Epichloë baconii, Epichloë festucae and Epichloë stromatolonga.

Epichloë mollis is found in Europe, where it has been identified in the grass species Holcus mollis.

References 

mollis
Fungi described in 1982
Fungi of Europe